TMZ is an American tabloid online newspaper.

TMZ may also refer to:

Places 
Taltson Magmatic Zone, a geologic region of Canada
Thames Aerodrome, New Zealand
Thirty-mile zone, California, U.S.

Arts and entertainment 
 TMZ on TV, a television series
 TMZ, a song by "Weird Al" Yankovic from Alpocalypse
 Too Many Zooz, a band from New York City, U.S.
 Kodak T-MAX P3200 film

Other uses 
Temozolomide, a drug
TMZ (motorcycle), a Soviet motorcycle manufacturer